Still Life with Candlestick (French: Nature morte aux chandeliers, Nature morte, chandeliers, Nature morte au chandelier, Le chandelier) is an oil painting created in 1922 by the French artist Fernand Léger.

This painting was stolen on 20 May 2010 from the Musée d'Art Moderne de la Ville de Paris.

The principal suspect, Vjeran Tomic (nicknamed "Spider-Man" for his ability to scale buildings), was commissioned by antiques dealer Jean-Michel Corvez to steal this painting by Léger. In the process, he stole paintings by Picasso, Matisse, Modigliani, and Braque.

The paintings taken, in addition to Still Life with Chandeliers, were Le pigeon aux petits pois (Dove with Green Peas, or Pigeon with Peas, 1911) by Pablo Picasso, La Pastorale (1906) by Henri Matisse, L'Olivier Près de l'Estaque (Olive Tree near L'Estaque, 1906) by Georges Braque,  (Woman with a Fan, 1919) by Amedeo Modigliani.  A window had been smashed and CCTV footage showed a masked man taking the paintings.  Authorities believe the thief acted alone. The man carefully removed the paintings from their frames, which he left behind.

The theft, executed with an extreme level of sophistication, is being investigated by the Brigade de Répression du Banditisme specialist unit of the French Police. It is unclear why the alarm systems in the museum failed to detect the robbery. Staff only noticing when they arrived at the museum just before . The museum closed on 20 May 2010, citing "technical reasons". The theft follows the $162 million heist of masterpieces by Cézanne, Degas, Van Gogh and Monet from Foundation E.G. Bührle in Zurich in February 2008 and could be one of the biggest art thefts in history (by value). It has been described as the "heist of the century".

The thief and his sponsor were found one year after the heist, and the latter declared that he was seized by panic after a police raid and a phone call by the police. For fear that investigators were closing in, accomplices apparently destroyed the paintings. "I threw them into the trash," cried Yonathan Birn, one of three people on trial in the case, "I made the worst mistake of my existence." However, neither the judge or other defendants believe Birn is telling the truth. Authorities believe all of the paintings were removed from France. Birn's co-defendants testified he was "too smart" to destroy €100 million worth of artwork.

See also
 List of stolen paintings

References

External links

 Fernand Léger, Nature morte au chandelier, Photo (C) RMN-Grand Palais / Agence Bulloz
 Sandy Nairne, Art Theft and the Case of the Stolen Turners, Reaktion Books, 2011, 

1922 paintings
Paintings by Fernand Léger
Cubist paintings
Lost paintings
Stolen works of art
Still life paintings